Street of Dreams was a musical with music and lyrics by Trisha Ward and co-written with Damon Rochefort. It was directed by John Stephenson. It was based on the television series Coronation Street and the 2011 album Coronation Street: Rogues, Angels, Heroes and Fools.

The show was originally scheduled to begin on 21 March 2012 at the Manchester Arena; however, due to the intricacy of scale involved, the opening date of the production was delayed until 9 May. The show was postponed after two performances and poor reviews. Stars including Julie Goodyear and Kevin Kennedy joined O'Grady in saying they had not been paid, with the two production companies behind the musical, Reckless Entertainment and Street of Dreams Ltd, being put into administration.

Principal roles and original cast

Song List

References

2012 musicals
Coronation Street
British musicals